This is a list of films originally produced and/or distributed theatrically by the independent entertainment company Amazon Studios.

2010s

2020s

Upcoming films

Undated films

References

External links
Official website

Amazon Studios
Amazon Studios
Amazon Studios films
Amazon (company)